The 2013 Belgian Cup Final, named Cofidis Cup after the sponsor, took place on 9 May 2013 between Genk and Cercle Brugge. It was the 58th Belgian Cup final and was won by Genk, with two late goals by Bennard Yao Kumordzi and Jelle Vossen.

Route to the final

Match

Details

External links
  

Belgian Cup finals
Cup Final
Belgian Cup Final 2013
Belgian Cup Final 2013
May 2013 sports events in Europe
Sports competitions in Brussels
2013 in Brussels